Jean-Christian Michel (born 1938) is a composer and clarinetist. His compositions are influenced by jazz and by baroque music, particularly that of Johann Sebastian Bach.
Before starting his musical career, Jean-Christian Michel was a doctor, as a surgeon.

His first record Requiem was released in 1966. He founded the ensemble Quatuor avec Orgue.
Michel has received 3 diamond discs, 7 platinum discs and 10 golden discs. With more than five million discs sold, (3 discs classified 1, 2 & 3 in the charts of CIDD-France soir in the seventies); and thousands of concerts to his credit, he today pursues a global career. Michel is a "Full Member" of the SACEM (an association of composers and music publishers to protect copyright and royalties). He received the prize for "Sciences and Culture" at Sorbonne, Paris, France, which was awarded by a jury of six Nobel Prize winners. Jean-Christian Michel is currently the godfather of the campaign Neurodon, within the Federation for Brain Research FRC Drummer Kenny Clarke played and recorded with Michel for 10 years.
Michel is also a very experienced mountain climber. He was a member of the group that made the first-ever ascent of Tawesche, in the Himalayas, in 1974.

Discography
Requiem
Aranjuez
Musique sacrée (with Kenny Clarke)
Crucifixus
JQM (with Kenny Clarke)
Le cœur des etoiles
Vision d’Ezéchiel
Ouverture spatiale (with Kenny Clarke)
Eve des origines (with Kenny Clarke)
Port-Maria (with Kenny Clarke)
Musique de lumière
Jean-Christian Michel in concert
Vif-obscur
Les années-lumière
Les cathédrales de lumière
Aranjuez 2004
Portail de l'espace 2005
Bach transcriptions 2006
Live concert 2007
Spatial Requiem 2008
Jean-Christian Michel plays jazz 2012

DVD
"Imaginaire" (2010)

References

External links
Michel's official site.

French composers
French male composers
1938 births
Living people